Masasi Town District Council is one of eight regional councils  of the Mtwara Region in Tanzania. It is bordered to the north and south by the Masasi District, to the east by the Newala District and to the west by the Nanyumbu District. According to the 2012 census, the district has a total population of 102,969.

Geography

Administrative subdivisions

Wards
The Masasi Town Council administratively has 14 wards.

 Chanikanguo
 Jida
 Marika
 Matawale
 Migongo
 Mkomaindo
 Mkuti
 Mpindimbi
 Mtandi
 Mwenge
 Mwenge Mtapika
 Nyasa
 Napupa
 Sululu
 Temeke

References

Districts of Mtwara Region